Seven Mile River or Sevenmile River may refer to a waterway in the United States:

Seven Mile River (East Brookfield River) in Massachusetts
Sevenmile River (Tenmile River) in Massachusetts and Rhode Island